Cathédrale Saint-Pierre may refer to:

 Cathédrale Saint-Pierre d'Angoulême in Angoulême
 Cathédrale Saint-Pierre d'Annecy in Annecy
 Cathédrale Saint-Pierre de Beauvais in Beauvais
 Cathédrale Saint-Pierre de Condom in Condom, Gers
 Cathédrale Saint-Pierre de Rennes in Rennes
 Cathédrale Saint-Pierre de Vannes in Vannes, Brittany
 Cathédrale Saint-Pierre et Saint-Paul de Nantes in Nantes
 Saint-Pierre Cathedral in Saint-Pierre, Saint Pierre and Miquelon
 St. Pierre Cathedral in Geneva

See also 
 St. Peter's Cathedral (disambiguation)